The Rape of Europa is a painting by the Venetian artist Titian, painted ca. 1560–1562. It is in the permanent collection of the Isabella Stewart Gardner Museum of Boston, Massachusetts. The oil-on-canvas painting measures .

Subject
The title of the painting refers to the mythological story of the abduction of Europa by Zeus (Jupiter to the Romans). In the myth, the god assumed the form of a bull and enticed Europa to climb onto his back. Once there, the bull rode into the sea and carried her to Crete, where he revealed his real identity. Europa became the first Queen of Crete, and had three children with Zeus.

Although the source of Titian's inspiration is thought to have been based on the scene from Book II in Ovid's Metamorphoses, a more direct influence might be a description of a painting of the rape of Europa found in Achilles Tatius's novel, Leucippe and Clitophon. Achilles Tatius's novel was translated into Italian and printed in 1546 in Venice, only a few years before Titian was thought to have painted The Rape of Europa. Achilles Tatius's description of the dolphins, Europa's scarf, a Cupid, Europa's covering, and "her position on the back of the bull—not with a leg on each side but with her feet on the bull’s right side and her left hand on his horn" is echoed in Titian's portrayal of the same scene.

Description 
Titian is unequivocal about the fact that this is a scene of rape (abduction): Europa is sprawled helplessly on her back, her clothes in disarray. The painting depicts Europa on the back of the bull, just off the shore of her homeland. Although the act of sexual violence is not depicted in the painting, it is implied through Europa's open-legged posture and her expression of fear as she is dragged off by Zeus. Her danger is also implied by her waving a red silk scarf and by the sea monster in the foreground of the painting. In other parts of the painting, two putti in the sky chase after Europa, and one rides on a dolphin in the sea.

Yael Even has theorized that Titian could have created this painting not due to any particular attachment to the subject, but in order to assert his abilities as a painter.

Provenance
The painting was one of the "poesie" painted by Titian for Philip II of Spain. With Diana and Callisto and Diana and Actaeon, both now shared by London and Edinburgh; it was one of three Titian poesie given by Philip V of Spain to the French ambassador, the Duke of Gramont, who in turn presented them to Philippe II, Duke of Orléans, Regent of France from 1715 to 1723. For most of the 18th century it was in the Orleans Collection in Paris. It was purchased by Bernard Berenson on behalf of art collector Isabella Stewart Gardner in 1896.

Titian's poesie series for Philip II 

 Danaë, delivered to Philip 1553, now Wellington Collection, with earlier and later versions.
 Venus and Adonis, Museo del Prado, delivered 1554, and several other versions
 The Rape of Europa, c. 1560–1562, Isabella Stewart Gardner Museum
 Diana and Actaeon, 1556–1559, owned jointly by London's National Gallery and the National Gallery of Scotland in Edinburgh
 Diana and Callisto, 1556–1559, owned jointly by London's National Gallery and the National Gallery of Scotland in Edinburgh
 Perseus and Andromeda, Wallace Collection, c. 1553–1562
 The Death of Actaeon, National Gallery, never delivered and not always counted in the series, c. 1559 onwards

Exhibitions 
The painting was included in the 1857 Manchester Art Treasures exhibition. From August 12, 2021, to January 2, 2022, the Isabella Stewart Gardner Museum displayed all six Titian poesie in an exhibit titled Titian: Women, Myth & Power. It was the first time since the 16th century that the six paintings were physically united.

Further reading 
FitzRoy, Charles, The Rape of Europa: The Intriguing History of Titian's Masterpiece, London: Bloomsbury, 2015.
Silver, Nathaniel, ed., Titian's Rape of Europa, Boston, Massachusetts: Isabella Stewart Gardner Museum, 2021.

References

1560s paintings
Mythological paintings by Titian
Paintings of Europa (consort of Zeus)
Fish in art
Paintings in the collection of the Isabella Stewart Gardner Museum
Paintings based on Metamorphoses
Water in art
Cattle in art
Paintings formerly in the Spanish royal collection
Paintings formerly in the Orleans Collection